Fun House is the second studio album by American rock band the Stooges. It was released on July 7, 1970, by Elektra Records. Though initially commercially unsuccessful, Fun House developed a strong cult following. Like its predecessor (1969's The Stooges) and its successor (1973's Raw Power), it is generally considered integral in the development of punk rock.

Recording sessions 
In 1969, Elektra Records had released the Stooges' debut album to mixed reviews and mediocre commercial success (peaking at number 106 on the Billboard charts). Company head Jac Holzman believed that MC5, another Michigan-based band, had more potential of success than the Stooges. Holzman asked former Kingsmen keyboardist Don Gallucci to produce the Stooges' second album.

Having seen the group live, Gallucci told Holzman that the Stooges were an "interesting group, but I don't think you can get this feeling on tape". Holzman said it didn't matter because he had already reserved recording time in L.A. The album was recorded at Elektra Sound Recorders in Los Angeles, California, from May 11 to 25, 1970. Gallucci's plan as a producer was to use each day to record about a dozen takes of a particular song and then pick the one that would appear on the album. The first day consisted of sound checking and run-throughs of all songs with heavy use of baffles between the amps and drums while singer Iggy Pop sang his vocals through a studio-style microphone on a boom stand.

The result was terrible in the band's opinion. They took exception to the atmosphere inside the studio with soundproof padding and isolators. To achieve their vision, the Stooges and Gallucci stripped the entire studio of its usual gear to emulate their live performances as closely as possible. According to Gallucci, they set up the band in the way they normally play at a concert. For example, Pop was singing through a handheld microphone, and the guitar and bass amps were placed side by side. The results were very raw when compared to many contemporary records; for example, without the normal isolation baffles the vibrations from the bass amplifier cause audible rattling of the snare drum on several songs.

Pop indicated that iconic blues singer Howlin' Wolf "was really pertinent for me on Fun House. That stuff is Wolfy, at least as I could do it."

The Stooges intended for "Loose" to be the album's first track; Elektra, however, felt that "Down on the Street" would be the stronger opener.

An alternate version of "Down on the Street", featuring a Doors-style organ overdubbed by Gallucci, was pulled from the album and released as a single. It was released the same month as Fun House, and fared slightly better on the charts.

Music and lyrics 
According to Billboard magazine, Fun House is set in hard rock and improvisation. Music critic Robert Christgau characterized the album as "genuinely 'avant-garde' rock" because of the music's apt "repetitiveness", "solitary new-thing saxophone", and "L.A. Blues", which showcases the "old avant-garde fallacy ... trying to make art about chaos by reproducing same." Greg Kot called Fun House "the Stooges' punk jazz opus".

In 1001 Albums You Must Hear Before You Die (2005), music journalist Stevie Chick wrote that the sleazy tales of hedonism and reckless abandon on the album's first half are followed by "the comedown", as evoked by looser song structures, Steve Mackay's freeform saxophone, and "Iggy sounding like a scared, lost child, warning from bitter experience that 'The Fun House will steal your heart away.'" "L.A. Blues" concludes the album with a flurry of noise and disoriented dual drumming, which Stylus Magazines Patrick McNally interpreted as the Stooges being "lost culturally and spiritually in the smoke and riots and confusion of Detroit and America at the dawn of the seventies, but also in the overwhelming squall and clatter of the sound that they—from nothing, from nowhere—managed to create."

Critical reception 

In a contemporary review, Charles Burton from Rolling Stone found Fun House to be "much more sophisticated" than the Stooges' debut album, writing that they sounded "so exquisitely horrible and down and out that they are the ultimate psychedelic rock band in 1970". Roy Hollingworth of Melody Maker was unimpressed however, calling it the worst record of the year and "a muddy load of sluggish, unimaginative rubbish heavily disguised by electricity and called American rock". Christgau wrote in his original review for The Village Voice that the Stooges' successful use of monotony and incorporation of saxophone had intellectual appeal, but questioned whether it was healthy as a listener for "[me] to have to be in a certain mood of desperate abandon before I can get on with them musically". He later said his criticism had been based on the album's "inaccessibility" as popular music, and wrote in Christgau's Record Guide: Rock Albums of the Seventies (1981):

In a retrospective review, AllMusic's Mark Deming hailed Fun House as "the ideal document of the Stooges at their raw, sweaty, howling peak", and wrote that it features better songs than their debut, significant improvement from each member, and Don Gallucci's energetic and immediate production. Dalton Ross of Entertainment Weekly wrote that the "radical" album sounded "primal, unpredictable, dangerous". Pitchfork critic Joe Tangari felt that the music's aggression has rarely been matched. He recommended it to "any rock fan with a sense of history" and asserted that, along with the Stooges' debut, Fun House is one of the most important predecessors to the punk rock movement. Barney Hoskyns called it a "proto-punk classic", and Jon Young of Spin hailed it as a "proto-punk landmark" that possessed a "magnificent chaos". According to Cleveland.com writer Troy L. Smith, "What was once dismissed as something too raw and primal, now sits as a work of unparalleled hard-rock genius", while music historian Simon Reynolds says "it clearly stands out as the most powerful hard-rock album of all time."

In 2003, Rolling Stone ranked Fun House number 191 on their list of 500 Greatest Albums of All Time, maintaining the rating in a 2012 revision, and moving it up to number 94 in the 2020 reboot of the list. Melody Maker said that it is, "no contest, the greatest rock n' roll album of all time". Lenny Kaye, writing for eMusic, called it a "rock and roll classic" and "one of the most frontal, aggressive, and joyously manic records ever". In The Rolling Stone Album Guide (2004), Scott Seward claimed that, although saying so "risks hyperbole", Fun House is "one of the greatest rock & roll records of all time" and that, "as great as they were, the Stones never went so deep, the Beatles never sounded so alive, and anyone would have a hard time matching Iggy Pop's ferocity as a vocalist."

Legacy and influence 

Australian band Radio Birdman chose their name based on mishearing the line "radio burnin' up above" in the song "1970". They also named their Oxford Street performance venue The Oxford Funhouse and covered "TV Eye" on their 1977 album Radios Appear.

John Zorn covered "T.V. Eye" for Rubáiyát: Elektra's 40th Anniversary: the same song was also covered for the glam rock film Velvet Goldmine by a supergroup featuring original Stooges guitarist Ron Asheton and members of Sonic Youth, with actor Ewan McGregor on vocals. The Birthday Party covered "Loose" on their 1982 live album Drunk on the Pope's Blood and, also live, the song "Funhouse": a version with sax played by J.G. Thirlwell appears on the 1999 CD The Birthday Party Live 81–82. the Damned's 1977 debut album, Damned Damned Damned, features a cover of "1970", entitled "I Feel Alright". Depeche Mode covered "Dirt" on their I Feel Loved single. Hanoi Rocks cover "1970" (titled "I Feel Alright") on their 1984 live album All Those Wasted Years. Spacemen 3 adapted "T.V. Eye" into the near-cover "OD Catastrophe" on their debut album Sound of Confusion. Michael Monroe also covered the song for his Another Night in the Sun live album in 2010. In 1989 indie rock band Blake Babies covered "Loose" for their album Earwig. They sampled Pop's voice into the song. Rage Against the Machine recorded a cover of "Down on the Street" on their 2000 covers album Renegades, and the main riff from their song "Sleep Now in the Fire" was inspired by the riff in "T.V. Eye." A cover of "Dirt" appears on disc one of Screeching Weasel's 1999 double CD compilation "Thank You Very Little". In 2010, the Nigerian songwriter Billy Bao and his band went into the studio exactly 40 years after the recording of the album and recorded their album "Buildings from Bilbao" using all titles and song times for their own songs (except "1970", which is updated as "2010", and "L.A. Blues", which is called "LAGOS Blues"). "Down on the Street" briefly appears on the song "Maggot Death (Live at Brighton)" off of the Throbbing Gristle album The Second Annual Report, as a field recording of a club playing the song over the P.A. system.

Numerous other musical artists have cited Fun House as their favorite album, including Joey Ramone, Mark E. Smith, Jack White, Nick Cave, Michael Gira, Buzz Osborne, Aaron North, Henry Rollins and Steve Albini. 

In 1999, Rhino Records released a limited edition box set, 1970: The Complete Fun House Sessions, featuring every take of every song from every day of the recording sessions, plus the single versions of "Down on the Street" and "1970". On August 16, 2005, the album was reissued by Elektra and Rhino as a two-CD set featuring a newly remastered version of the album on disc one and a variety of outtakes (essentially highlights from the Complete Fun House Sessions box set. Jack White contributed a quote to Pop biographer Paul Trynka's liner notes to the reissue, in which White dubbed Fun House "by proxy the definitive rock album of America".

In 2005, the Stooges performed the album live in its entirety as part of the All Tomorrow's Parties-curated Don't Look Back series. "Dirt" was ranked number 46 on Gibson's "Top 50 Guitar Solos" list in 2010.

The title track was on the soundtrack to the 2004 video game MTX Mototrax, "1970" appeared in Tony Hawk's Underground 2 the same year and "Down on the Street" appeared in Battlefield: Hardline in 2015.

The album had sold 89,000 copies through March 2000.

Track listing

Personnel 
The Stooges
 Iggy Pop – vocals
 Ron Asheton – guitar
 Dave Alexander – bass guitar
 Scott Asheton – drums
 Steve Mackay – saxophone

Technical
 Don Gallucci – production, organ overdubs
 Brian Ross-Myring – remastering, engineer
 Tom Hummer – assistant engineer

See also 
1970: The Complete Fun House Sessions

References

Bibliography

External links 
 Listen to the album online on Radio3Net, a radio channel of Romanian Radio Broadcasting Company.
 

The Stooges albums
Elektra Records albums
Rhino Records albums
1970 albums
Albums produced by Don Gallucci